Asterix & Obelix XXL is an action-adventure video game first released in 2003. It is based on the French comic book series Asterix about the Gaulish warrior Asterix in the year 50 BC, as he and his best friend Obelix battle the Romans. It was released in the United States (for PlayStation 2 only) with the title Asterix & Obelix: Kick Buttix.

A sequel was released the following year, Asterix & Obelix XXL 2: Mission Las Vegum.

Plot
One ordinary day in the village, Asterix, Obelix, and Dogmatix leave for the forest to hunt for wild boars. As they are walking, a storm begins to brew, and a nearby tree is struck by lightning. Dogmatix is frightened and runs away. While they are searching for him, Asterix and Obelix see flames in the distance. Asterix hurries off to investigate, while Obelix remains and searches for Dogmatix. Upon arriving at the scene, Asterix meets a Roman secret agent, formerly in Caesar's service. He feels scorned for having been sacked by Caesar and agrees to help Asterix and Obelix foil the Romans' plans. Asterix enters the village to find it ablaze and full of Romans. He quickly defeats them and makes his way through the Gaulish countryside to a hilltop by the sea. There, he meets up with Obelix, who tells him that Dogmatix is still nowhere to be found. They learn from the Roman agent that their fellow villagers have been kidnapped by the Romans. Asterix and Obelix then follow him to a dock, where he points out two barges far off in the distance, and mentions that their friends are probably being held prisoner aboard them. Farther up the path, the secret agent finds Dogmatix, and Obelix's beloved pet joins the duo in their Roman-bashing antics. Asterix and Obelix then fight off many more Roman soldiers, plowing through a country road. After finally defeating all of the warriors, the two discover a padlocked wagon at the end of the road. Obelix breaks open the door, and the village druid, Getafix, clambers out. He explains to them that while he was locked up, he overheard Caesar's plans to send the Gaulish villagers to different parts of the Roman Empire. Their locations were etched into a white marble map, which Caesar smashed after showing to his soldiers. Thus, Getafix returns to the village, and Asterix, Obelix, and Dogmatix set off to the first location to free their fellow villagers from the clutches of the Romans.

Gameplay
Gameplay involves the rescuing of various villagers while solving large puzzles and defeating the Roman masses. The player automatically switches between Asterix and Obelix depending on the situation. The two characters have slight differences, such as in speed or strength. The only significant difference is Obelix's ability to smash iron crates without magic potion and his ability to push and pull larger platforms than can Asterix. Many puzzles involve the use of a special reusable torch that only Asterix may carry, and a sliding platform guided by a rope, both of which occur in every province of the Roman Empire.

The player may redeem helmets collected from defeated Romans. These helmets can be used to purchase power-ups, such as extra health and new attack combinations from a traveling merchant in each province. There are two types of helmet: ordinary grunts' helmets (worth 1 helmet) and gold centurions' helmets (worth 10 helmets). The latter are usually acquired from iron crates or dropped by high-ranking enemies, such as commanders and gladiators. The player can also pick up gourds of magic potion, which are found regularly. These can only be consumed by Asterix, and are used immediately when collected. After consuming the potion, the player becomes much more powerful for an extremely limited time. The potion allows Asterix to defeat Romans in a single hit and to run much faster. In addition, they allow a player to perform a triple jump and smash iron crates. If Asterix consumes another potion while already under the effect of a previous one, he will generate a huge shockwave that causes all nearby enemies to drop their weapons.

Combat is performed by bashing the Romans with bare hands. The ordinary grunts are the easiest to defeat, with many more powerful classes of enemies. After being bashed, certain enemies will remain dazed for a few moments, at which point some of them can be picked up and swung around the head like a lasso, damaging all other enemies in the vicinity and breaking nearby crates. Dogmatix can also be dispatched during battle. He will bite the enemy soldiers, causing them to drop their weapons and rendering them easily vulnerable to attack.

In each province, the heroes will encounter the Roman agent, who will provide them with helpful information on operating machinery and bring them up to date on the Romans' latest plans. At the end of each province (with the exception of Gaul), there is a boss fight. The bosses are invariably large machines of war, operated by several Romans. After the machines are destroyed, the captive villagers are set free, and they provide Asterix and Obelix with another section of the marble map, allowing them to continue on and rescue the other villagers. Each province (with the exception of Gaul) contain unique enemies native to that area. Players are able to revisit any previous areas in order to collect more helmets, or to find more Golden Laurels.

Throughout the game, players may find Golden laurel wreaths, accessible under different conditions; some are as simple as picking them up, while others are obtained by complex puzzles or fulfilling various conditions. The laurel wreaths when collected permit the player to unlock hidden bonuses, such as new attire, purely for cosmetic effect.

Transport in the game is fulfilled by a manner of catapulting. At different points in an area, the player may find a catapult, which when used will send the player to the next location nearby instantaneously.

Remaster
On 28 July 2020, Microids announced a remastered version dubbed Asterix & Obelix XXL Romastered set for release on PlayStation 4, Xbox One, Nintendo Switch and Microsoft Windows on 22 October 2020. It was later released for macOS and PlayStation 5 in 2022. The remaster features upgraded visuals, reworked gameplay animations, new game modes, a new camera and new soundtrack. An option to switch to the original visuals and soundtrack is also included.

Reception

References

External links
 

2003 video games
Atari games
Action-adventure games
Game Boy Advance games
GameCube games
Média-Participations franchises
Microïds games
PlayStation 2 games
Video games based on Asterix
Video games developed in France
Video games set in the Roman Empire
Depictions of Julius Caesar in video games
Windows games
PlayStation 4 games
Nintendo Switch games
Xbox One games
MacOS games
PlayStation 5 games
3D platform games
Single-player video games
Étranges Libellules games
OSome Studio games